Chitala lopis, locally known as the belido, is an extinct  species of freshwater fish, formerly endemic to the islands of Java and Sumatra in Indonesia. It inhabited lowland river mainstreams and tributaries with rocky and sunken wood bottoms, as well as forest-covered streams. It fed on smaller fishes, insects and vertebrates, mostly at night. It is now considered extinct.

References

Notopteridae
Freshwater fish of Java
Endemic fauna of Java
Fish described in 1851